The United Rocket and Space Corporation or URSC was a Russian joint-stock corporation formed by the Russian government in 2013 to renationalize the Russian space sector.  The government intended to do so in such a way as to "preserve and enhance the Roscosmos space agency". The reorganization continued into 2014 with a Sberbank cooperation agreement, and 2015 with a process to merge with the Russian Federal Space Agency to create the Roscosmos State Corporation.  Roscosmos Space Agency, as a state agency, was abolished in December 2015 and the Roscosmos state-run corporation took over 1 January 2016.

History
In announcing the new corporation in August 2013, Russian Deputy Prime Minister Dmitry Rogozin said "the failure-prone space sector is so troubled that it needs state supervision to overcome its problems." 
The name for the organization had first been provisionally floated in July 2013 when—three days following the failure of a Proton M launch—the Russian government announced that "extremely harsh measures" would be taken "and spell the end of the [Russian] space industry as we know it."
Rogozin indicated it would be "consolidate[d] under a single state-controlled corporation within a year."

More detailed plans released in October 2013 called for a re-nationalization of the "troubled space industry," with sweeping reforms including a new "unified command structure and reducing redundant capabilities, acts that could lead to tens of thousands of layoffs."  The Russian space sector employs about 250,000 people, while the United States has about 70,000 people working in the field.
"Russian space productivity is eight times lower than America’s, with companies duplicating one anothers’ work and operating at about 40 percent efficiency."

In December 2013 President Putin issued the presidential decree setting up the corporation. The decree stipulated that the corporation will take over manufacturing facilities from the Federal Space Agency (Roscosmos).

The President of Energia, Vitaly Lopota was removed from his post as president on August 1, 2014.  Dmitry Rogoziin indicated that this was the start of  "Long-awaited personnel reform in [the Russian] space industry ... Tough times require tough decisions."

In November 2014, it was announced that one part of the URSC charter is to increase the relative wages of those who work in the Russian space sector in order to attempt to counteract the low productivity and brain drain that has been hindering the industry. URSC projected that the Russian space sector would employ 196,000 people by 2016. URSC's publicly-stated long-term goal in late 2014 was to increase productivity of the space sector, threefold while doubling real wages by 2025.

Despite Russian state efforts in the reorganization, two more Proton launch vehicle failures occurred in 2014 and 2015.

The government reorganized all of Russia's rocket engine companies into a single entity in June 2015.  NPO Energomash, as well as all other engine companies, became a part of URSC.

The decree to actually abolish Roscosmos as a state agency was signed by Vladimir Putin in December 2015, which was replaced by a state-run corporation effective 1 January 2016.

In May 2018, Putin selected Rogozin to be the head of the Russian state space corporation Roscosmos.

Organization and entities
When formed, the company included most companies and design bureaus, save for some defence companies. The corporation initially consisted of nine federal unitary enterprises to be turned into open joint-stock companies. The URSC's authorized capital included the shares of 13 other companies. Subsequently, each of them was expected to contribute 100 percent of their shares minus one share to the new corporation's authorized capital.  The corporation was 100 percent state-owned.

By August 2013, United Rocket and Space Corporation planned to acquire a controlling interest in rocket-engine manufacturer Energia, of which the Russian government previously owned a 38 percent interest.

"The consolidation [of the Russian space industry] will absorb 33 space organizations, including 16 enterprises. The main focus will be on subcontractors and suppliers."

Heavy-lift rocket
Following the URSC formation announcement, Oleg Ostapenko, the head of Roscosmos, the Russian Federal Space Agency, proposed in November 2013 that a new heavy lift launch vehicle be built for the Russian space program.

Impact
Even the Russian mainstream press have called this a radical reorganization of an important Russian industry.  For example, RIA Novosti called it a radical centralization of the Russian space industry.

In February 2014, Yevgeny Anisimov was removed from his position of head of Baikonur space center in Kazakhstan, after a 30-year career at the center, and having been head since 2010.

See also
Gazprom Space Systems
Khrunichev State Research and Production Space Center
NPO Energomash
S.P. Korolev Rocket and Space Corporation Energia

References

External links
Official Webpage

2013 establishments in Russia
Roscosmos divisions and subsidiaries
Companies based in Moscow
Government-owned companies of Russia